Samantha Randle (born 24 November 1998) is a South African swimmer. She competed in the women's 1500 metre freestyle event at the 2017 World Aquatics Championships. In 2019, she represented South Africa at the 2019 African Games held in Rabat, Morocco.

References

External links
 

1998 births
Living people
African Games medalists in swimming
African Games gold medalists for South Africa
African Games silver medalists for South Africa
Swimmers at the 2019 African Games
South African female swimmers
Place of birth missing (living people)
South African female freestyle swimmers
20th-century South African women
21st-century South African women